Granite State Challenge is an American television quizbowl game show that airs on New Hampshire Public Television and began in 1983.

Description
High schools from around the state compete against each other to win "brainy bragging rights" and grant money for their school. The first season of the program was hosted by Tom Bergeron (now of America's Funniest Home Videos and Dancing with the Stars fame), one of Bergeron's first jobs appearing on television.  Starting in the second season and continuing to 2018, Jim Jeannotte took over hosting duties. Jon Cannon became the host in the 2018-2019 season.  Prior co-hosts include, Lori Warriner, Tim Estiloz, John Herman, and Alison MacNair (former host of NHPTV's NH Outlook).  

The competition features 16 teams in a single elimination tournament competing in half-hour shows that are pretaped over a few weeks and air through the broadcast season. The program previously selected 32 teams to compete on the televised rounds based on state geography and recent appearances; however, after a year-long hiatus, the program required interested teams to complete a written test, with the top-scoring sixteen teams earning spots. The championship game is called the Superchallenge. 

Since 1995, part of the funding for Granite State Challenge comes from proceeds of the New Hampshire Lottery Commission. Unitil Corporation is also one of the show's primary sponsors.  Beginning in 2008, each episode is available to view on YouTube and to download at no charge on iTunes. Since 2012/2013, the winners of the NHPTV Granite State Challenge faces off against the WGBH High School Quiz Show Champions for a trophy called the "Governors Cup". Since the Governor's Cup started, New Hampshire (NHPTV) has 2 wins and Massachusetts (WGBH) has three wins.

Rules
The game is played by two teams of four, and uses a four-quarter format. All four quarters are played to a time limit.

The first quarter is a round of toss-up questions worth 10 points each. In the 30th season, one 30-point toss-up based on the year 1984 is included.

The second quarter uses 20-point toss-ups.

The third quarter is the show's "60-second" round. Since the 30th season, the teams' alternates (if any) participate in this round only. The trailing team gets the first choice of three categories, and the leading team picks from the remaining two. Each team gets 60 seconds to answer either 10 questions with each question worth 10 points. A 10-point bonus is awarded for answering all questions correctly.

The fourth quarter is a final round of 20-point toss-ups. Since the 30th season, 20 points are deducted should a team provide an incorrect answer.

The winning team advances in a season-long tournament. Previously, in the final, titled "Granite State SuperChallenge," there were seven rounds: the first, fifth, and seventh are toss-up rounds, the second and fourth rounds are toss-ups followed by bonuses, and the third and sixth rounds are the 60-second lightning rounds. However, since the 30th season, the SuperChallenge lasts four rounds.

Past champions
This is a list of past GSC winners since 1983.

1983-84 Londonderry def. Laconia (inaugural championship, inaugural champion also has longest title drought)
1984-85 Phillips Exeter Academy def. Hollis/Brookline (school's only title)
1985-86 St. Thomas def. Winnisquam (school's only title)
1986-87 Bishop Guertin def. Merrimack 
1987-88 Winnisquam def. Hollis/Brookline (5th Anniversary)
1988-89 Alvirne def. Pinkerton
1989-90 Laconia def. Woodsville
1990-91 Hanover def. John Stark
1991-92 Portsmouth def. Dover 
1992-93 Winnisquam def. John Stark (10th Anniversary, first repeat champion)
1993-94 Alvirne def. Kearsarge
1994-95 Laconia def. Keene
1995-96 Plymouth def. Woodsville
1996-97 Keene def. Oyster River (school's only title)
1997-98 Salem def. Derryfield (15th Anniversary)
1998-99 Oyster River def. Profile
1999-2000 Kearsarge def. Derryfield (school's only title)
2000-01 Oyster River def. Trinity (first championship in back to back appearances)
2001-02 Salem def. Winnisquam
2002-03 Hanover def. Winnacunnet (20th Anniversary)
2003-04 Winnisquam def. Trinity
2004-05 Alvirne def. Inter-Lakes
2005-06 Manchester West def. Winnacunnet (school's only title) 
2006-07 Hanover def. Derryfield 
2007-08 John Stark def. Winnacunnet (25th Anniversary, school's only title)
2008-09 Hollis/Brookline def. Phillips Exeter Academy (school's only title) 
2009-10 Manchester Central def. Hanover (school's only title)
2010-11 Bishop Brady def. ConVal (school's only title)
2012-13 Plymouth def. Hanover
2013-14 Pinkerton def. Bishop Guertin (school's only title)
2014-15 Bishop Guertin def. Pinkerton
2015-16 Nashua High School South def. Merrimack High School
2016-17 Nashua High School South def. Bedford High School (first championship in consecutive years)
2017-18 Salem def. Plymouth (Jim Jeannotte's last season as host)
2018-19 Plymouth def. Littleton High School
2019-20 Merrimack def. Plymouth 
2020-21 Merrimack def. Bow
2021-22 Portsmouth def. Merrimack

Schools with Multiple Titles:

Three Titles Apiece

Hanover (2006–07, 2002–03, 1990–91)
Alvirne (2004–05, 1993–94, 1988–89)
Winnisquam (2003–04, 1992–93, 1987–88)
Salem (2017–18, 2001–02, 1997–98)
Plymouth (2018–19, 2012–13, 1995–96)

Two Titles Apiece

Oyster River (2000–01, 1998–99)
Laconia (1994–95, 1989–90)
Bishop Guertin (2014–15, 1986–87)
Nashua High School South (2016-2017, 2015–16)
Merrimack High School (2019-2020, 2020-2021)
Portsmouth High School (1991-1992, 2021-2022)

References

External links
New Hampshire Public Television's Granite State Challenge

1983 American television series debuts
Student quiz television series
1980s American game shows
1990s American game shows
English-language television shows